The Coalinga Polk Street School, in Coalinga, California, was listed on the National Register of Historic Places in 1982 and destroyed by an earthquake in 1983.

Also known as Old Polk Street School, it was located at S. 5th and E. Polk Streets in Coalinga and was built in 1908.

Its bell tower is on display at the R.C. Baker Museum in Coalinga.

It had an irregular plan within a  rectangular area, and had elements of Classical Revival style, esp. in its entrance portico on its north facade.

References

Schools in California
National Register of Historic Places in Fresno County, California
Neoclassical architecture in California
School buildings completed in 1908
1908 establishments in California